Yagya Bhasin is an Indian child actor. He is associated with Hindi film and Television Industry. He is mainly known for his roles Aditya Nigam in Panga (starring Kangana Ranaut and Jassie Gill) and Saaransh Khurana in Yeh Hai Chahatein.

Early life 
Bhasin was born in Uttarakhand. His father Deepak Bhasin was a government employee and his mother owned a beauty salon but they quit their jobs for their son's career and moved to Mumbai.

Career 
Bhasin started his acting career with the television show Mere Sai. In 2018, he played as Arjun in CID and Malai in Krishna Chali London. In 2019, he acted in The Office as Cricketer Manoj Rahira.

In 2020, Bhasin made his debut in Hindi film industry with the film Panga directed by Ashwiny Iyer Tiwari. Bollywood Hungama, in its review said "Yagya Bhasin is a rockstar. He gets to play a great part and he uplifts the mood of the film in many places". Filmfare, in its review said "The film has some of the funniest lines around and most of them fall into the child actor Yagya’s lot. He’s shown to be rather a sassy kid and is as natural as they come. His delivery of the witty dialogue keeps you in splits". Bhasin also appeared in The Kapil Sharma Show, with Kangana Ranaut, Jassie Gill and Neena Gupta.

In the same year, he acted in Yeh Hain Chahtein as Saraansh.

Filmography

Television

Film

Upcoming 
Bal Naren (title role)
Bishwa (title role)

References

External links 
 

Living people
Indian male child actors
21st-century Indian male child actors
Indian male film actors
Indian male television actors
Male actors in Hindi cinema
Male actors in Hindi television
Male actors from Bangalore
21st-century Indian male actors
Year of birth missing (living people)